or  is a village in Evenes Municipality in Nordland county, Norway. The European route E10 highway passes just north of the village.

References

Evenes
Villages in Nordland
Populated places of Arctic Norway